Oriole Records may refer to:

 Oriole Records (U.S.), a record label of the 1920s and 1930s
 Oriole Records (UK), founded in 1925 and taken over in 1964